Hubert Thompson may refer to:
 Hugh Thompson (athlete) (Hubert Thompson), Canadian middle-distance runner
 Hubert Gordon Thompson, English surgeon, missionary doctor, author, photographer, and explorer